A slide projector is an opto-mechanical device for showing photographic slides.

35 mm slide projectors, direct descendants of the larger-format magic lantern, first came into widespread use during the 1950s as a form of occasional home entertainment; family members and friends would gather to view slide shows. Reversal film was much in use, and supplied slides snapped during vacations and at family events. Slide projectors were also widely used in educational and other institutional settings.

Photographic film slides and projectors have mostly been replaced by image files on digital storage media shown on a projection screen by using a video projector or simply displayed on a large-screen video monitor.

History 

A continuous-slide lantern was patented in 1881.  It included a dissolving views apparatus.

Components
A projector has four main elements:
 electric incandescent light bulb or other light source (usually fan-cooled)
 reflector and "condensing" lens to direct the light to the slide
 slide holder
 focusing lens

A flat piece of heat-absorbing glass is often placed in the light path between the condensing lens and the slide, to avoid damaging the latter. This glass transmits visible wavelengths but absorbs infrared. Light passes through the transparent slide and lens, and the resulting image is enlarged and projected onto a perpendicular flat screen so the audience can view its reflection. Alternatively, the image may be projected onto a translucent "rear projection" screen, often used for continuous automatic display for close viewing. This form of projection also avoids the audience interrupting the light stream by casting their shadows on the projection or by bumping into the projector.

Types
 Straight-tray slide projectors
 Carousel slide projectors 
 Stack-loader slide projectors
 Slide cube projectors
 Dual slide projectors
 Single slide projectors (manual form)
 Dissolve projectors
 Slide viewer projectors
 Stereo slide projectors project two slides simultaneously with different polarizations, making slides appear as three-dimensional to viewers wearing polarizing glasses
 Medium-format slide projectors
 Large-format slide projectors for use on stages, at large events, or for architectural and advertising installations where high light output is needed.
 Overhead projectors

Manufacturers
List of known manufacturers of slide projectors:
 Agfa Gevaert, Germany (–1984) → Reflecta (1984–)
 , Germany → Bosch; ceased production
 Bausch & Lomb; ceased production
 Bell & Howell / TDC, US: "Headliner"; ceased production
 Braun AG, Germany: "D", "PA"; ceased production
 Braun Foto Technik, Germany: "Paximat", "Multimag" → Reflecta
 VEB DEFA, Germany: "Filius"→ VEB Gerätewerk Friedrichshagen: "Filius"; ceased production
 Eastman Kodak (–2004): "Carousel-S", "Ektagraphic", "Ektapro" → Leica
 Elmo, Japan
 Enna, Germany; ceased production
 Erno Photo, Germany; ceased production
 VEB Feinmess, Germany; ceased production
 Filmoli, Germany → Gebr. Martin, Germany; ceased production
 Foto Quelle, Germany: "Revue"; ceased distribution
 GAF, US; ceased distribution
 Götschmann, Germany (1978–2009) → Gecko-Cam (2009–)
 Hasselblad, Sweden; ceased production
 HASPE, Germany; ceased production
 Hähnel, Germany; ceased production
 Inox, France: "Prestige" → Prestinox
 , Germany: "Diafocus" → Leica
 Leitz, Germany (1958–): "Prado" → Leica Projektion GmbH Zett Gerätewerk, Germany (1990–2004): "Pradovit", "Pradovit RT" → Leica Camera, Germany (2004–2006): "Pradovit"; ceased production
 , Germany: "Fantax", "Diafant", "Fantimat"; ceased production
 Malinski, Germany: "Prokyon", "Malicolor" → Pentacon
 Minolta, Japan; ceased production
 Minox, Germany: "Minomat"; ceased production
 Navitar, US
 Nikon, Japan; ceased production
 Ernst Plank, Germany: "Noris", "Trumpf"; ceased production
 Pentacon, Germany: "Aspectar", "Malicolor"; ceased production
 Asahi Pentax, Japan; ceased production
 Prestinox, France → Plawa Condor (1969–?); ceased production
 Pouva, Germany; ceased production
 RBT, Germany
 Queen, Germany: "Automat"; ceased distribution
 Reflecta, Germany: "Multimag"
 Rollei, Germany (1960–2007): "Rolleiscop", "Rolleivision" → Franke & Heidecke, Germany (2007–2009): "Rolleivision" → DHW Fototechnik, Germany (2009–2015): "Rolleivision"; ceased production
 Royal, Germany?; ceased distribution
 Sankyo, Japan; ceased production
 Sawyer's, US; company sold to GAF
 , Italy → Bauer and Rollei; ceased production
 
 Vicom
 Vivitar, US
 Voigtländer, Germany: "Perkeo" → Zett
 Zeiss Ikon, Germany (1964/1969–): "Ikolux" → Zett
 Zeiss Jena, Germany → Pentacon, Germany
 Zett, Germany (1928–1989): "Fafix", "Zett", "Zettomat", "Perkeo" → Leica Projektion GmbH Zett Gerätewerk, Germany (1990–2004)
 CBИTЯ3ъ, Russia: "ABTO"; ceased production

See also
 Slide viewer
 Carousel slide projector
 Presentation slide

References

General references

Inline citations

 
Display devices
Slide projectors
de:Projektor#Durchlichtprojektion